Murkongselek railway station(মূৰ্কংচেলেক ৰেলৱে ষ্টেচন) is a main railway station in Dhemaji district, Assam. Its code is MZS. It serves Murkongselek town. The station consists of two platforms. The station has been upgraded to a standard Class II Station.
. It is a railway station which connects Assam to Arunachal Pradesh.

Station details

Platforms
There are a total of 3 platforms and 5 tracks. The platforms are connected by foot overbridge. These platforms are built to accommodate 24 coaches express train.

Murkongselek railway station has a separate platform for receiving and unloading freight (goods) trains.

Station layout

Major Trains 

 Kamakhya–Murkongselek Lachit Express
 Rangapara North–Murkongselek Passenger
 Dekargaon–Murkongselek Passenger

Underconstruction new rail lines 

227 km Murkongselek–Pasighat–Tezu–Rupai line is being undertake as a strategic project.

Nearest airport

The nearest airports are Dibrugarh Airport, Lilabari Airport at Lakhimpur district, Pasighat Airport at Arunachal Pradesh.( Nearly 37 km).

See also

References

External links 

 Murkongselek Station Junction Map

Railway stations in Dhemaji district
Rangiya railway division